An Intergenerational shared site is a program in which children, youth and older adults participate in ongoing services and/or programming concurrently at the same site, and where participants interact during regularly scheduled planned intergenerational activities, as well as through informal encounters.  

Benefits of shared sites include that they enhance quality of life for all participants, improve attitudes about different age groups, provide needed services to the community, increase cost savings and create opportunities to share resources, and attract additional funding sources and acts as positive public relations/marketing tools. Intergenerational shared sites serve and provide care to children, youth and older adults and also act as a mechanism to address of the social implications of an increasingly age-segregated society.

References 

Community building